Yaḩyá Khēl (variants: Yaḩyākhēl, Yaḩyā Kheyl, Ya Khel, Yakh’yakheyl’, Yeḩyākhēl) is a village in Paktika Province, in southeastern-central Afghanistan

See also
 Paktika Province
 Musahiban, an Afghan clan.

References

Populated places in Paktika Province